The  is the competition regulator in Japan. It is a commission of the Japanese government responsible for regulating economic competition, as well as enforcement of the Antimonopoly Act.

Actions
On July 13, 2004, the commission asked Microsoft to remove a clause which it thinks is hurting activities of Japanese companies getting licenses of Microsoft Windows from Microsoft. Microsoft had previously faced another action from the JFTC when Japanese manufacturers were forced to include Microsoft Word on new systems instead of homegrown word processor software Ichitaro.

Members of the Commission

Current members of the JFTC

See also
Competition law
Competition policy
Consumer protection

References

External links
  
  

Cabinet Office (Japan)
Competition regulators
Government agencies of Japan
Regulation in Japan